Notogomphus dendrohyrax is a species of dragonfly in the family Gomphidae. It is found in Malawi, Mozambique, Tanzania, and Zimbabwe. Its natural habitats are subtropical or tropical moist lowland forests and rivers. It is threatened by habitat loss.

References

Gomphidae
Taxonomy articles created by Polbot